Timothy John Wrightman (born March 27, 1960) is an American former professional football player who was a tight end. He played for two seasons for the Chicago Bears of the National Football League (NFL).  Wrightman played college football for the UCLA Bruins and was drafted in the 3rd round by the Chicago Bears in the 1982 NFL Draft. But a contract dispute with the Bears led him to sign with the Chicago Blitz of the United States Football League (USFL), thus making him the first NFL draft pick who signed with the now defunct USFL. He won a Super Bowl ring with the Bears in 1985, and was re-signed to a two-year deal in 1986.

References

1960 births
Living people
All-American college football players
American football tight ends
Arizona Wranglers players
Chicago Bears players
Chicago Blitz players
People from Harbor City, Los Angeles
Players of American football from Los Angeles
UCLA Bruins football players
People from Weiser, Idaho